Andrew J. Newman is a reader at the University of Edinburgh. He holds the chair of Islamic Studies and Persian.

Education
Professor Newman holds a BA in history from Dartmouth College, where he graduated summa cum laude, as well as a MA and Phd in Islamic Studies from UCLA.

Career
He joined IMES in 1996, having been a Research Fellow at both the Wellcome Unit for the History of Medicine, Oxford and Green College, Oxford, whilst researching topics in the history of Islamic medicine.

As well as a large number of academic articles on Islamic Studies and Persian History, he has authored two books: The Formative Period of Shi'i Law: Hadith as Discourse Between Qum and Baghdad (2000) and Safavid Iran: Rebirth of a Persian Empire (2006). (Reviews:)

His work on Safavid Iran won Iran's book of the year prize for 2007 in the category of Iranian Studies.

References

External links 
 Profile at University of Edinburgh

Academics of the University of Edinburgh
British Islamic studies scholars
Dartmouth College alumni
University of California, Los Angeles alumni
Living people
Year of birth missing (living people)
Iranologists